Clark Center Lutheran Church is a historic church in rural Clark County, South Dakota. The church was added to the National Register in 2005.

The Clark Center Lutheran Church congregation was organized in 1883. The church itself was built in 1898. It was constructed of wood in late Gothic revival architectural style. The church was built on a stone foundation with wood clapboard siding. Sunday school rooms and the sacristy were added to the north side and a front entry added to the southeast corner in 1940.

References

Lutheran churches in South Dakota
Churches on the National Register of Historic Places in South Dakota
Gothic Revival church buildings in South Dakota
Churches completed in 1898
Churches in Clark County, South Dakota
1898 establishments in South Dakota
National Register of Historic Places in Clark County, South Dakota